Michael Robert McDonald (born January 15, 1991, in Modesto, California, United States) is a retired American mixed martial artist. McDonald competed in the Bantamweight division of the UFC, where he challenged for the interim UFC Bantamweight Championship at 22 years of age. He also competed in the Bantamweight division of Bellator MMA before retiring following another hand injury. 

A professional fighter since 2007, McDonald fought mostly in regional promotions in his home state of California before signing with Zuffa in 2010.

Career

Background
McDonald started training in kickboxing at the age of ten, turned to mixed martial arts at 13, started his amateur career at 14, and turned professional at 16 in 2007.  He also has two brothers who have professional careers in mixed martial arts. His older brother Justin Smitely is currently signed with Bellator MMA. He trains at Oakdale Mixed Martial Arts with the Last Stand Fight Team. McDonald graduated in 2009 from Grace M. Davis High School where he was voted Best Athlete and Most Likely to Succeed.

Early career
He gained notable wins on the regional circuit defeating WEC veteran Manny Tapia and former WEC Featherweight Champion, Cole Escovedo.  Against the latter, McDonald later avenged his only professional defeat, which also earned him the Tachi Palace Fights Bantamweight title with a second-round KO. In the summer of 2010, he was listed as one of the top rising stars under the age of 25.

World Extreme Cagefighting
In September 2010, at age 19, McDonald became the youngest fighter on the Zuffa roster when he signed with the WEC.  He defeated Clint Godfrey via first round submission in his promotional debut on November 11, 2010, at WEC 52.

Ultimate Fighting Championship
On October 28, 2010, World Extreme Cagefighting merged with the Ultimate Fighting Championship. As part of the merger, all WEC fighters were transferred to the UFC.

McDonald was expected to face Nick Pace on March 26, 2011, at UFC Fight Night 24. However, Pace was forced out of the bout with an injury and replaced by promotional newcomer Edwin Figueroa. McDonald won the fight via unanimous decision.  The fight was highly entertaining with both fighters exchanging strikes and submission attempts throughout the entire fight and earned Fight of the Night honors.

McDonald faced Chris Cariaso on May 30, 2011, at UFC 130, replacing an injured Norifumi Yamamoto. He won the fight via split decision.

McDonald was expected to face Johnny Eduardo on November 19, 2011, at UFC 139. However, Eduardo was forced from the card with an injury and replaced by promotional newcomer Alex Soto. McDonald defeated Soto via first-round KO, earning Knockout of the Night honors. McDonald clipped Soto with a counter right hand and then swarmed Soto with a flurry of punches against the fence, forcing the referee to stop the bout just 59 seconds into the first round.

McDonald fought former WEC Bantamweight Champion Miguel Angel Torres on April 21, 2012, at UFC 145. He won the fight via first round Knockout.

On December 4, 2012, UFC President Dana White announced that the UFC Bantamweight Champion Dominick Cruz had reinjured his ACL requiring surgery and would be out for 6–9 months.  McDonald faced the UFC Interim Bantamweight Champion Renan Barão on February 16, 2013, at UFC on Fuel TV: Barão vs. McDonald. McDonald was competitive with capable take-down defense and crisp boxing - particularly in the first two rounds - but ultimately succumbed to Barão's more diverse skillset as he mixed in knees and kicks standing together with take-downs. Barão secured an arm-triangle choke at 3:57 of the fourth round, forcing the tap from McDonald.

McDonald faced Brad Pickett on August 17, 2013, at UFC Fight Night 26. He dominated the first round, almost finishing Pickett with strikes before gaining a second round submission victory with a triangle choke. The win also earned McDonald his first Submission of the Night award, and he and Pickett earned the Fight of the Night bonus award as well.

McDonald faced Urijah Faber on December 14, 2013, at UFC on Fox 9.  After a back and forth first round, Faber stunned McDonald in the second with a flurry of punches, McDonald went to the canvas and Faber jumped on him and finished the fight by submission due to a guillotine choke.

After being sidelined for all of 2014 and 2015 nursing a litany of injuries, including hand and wrist surgeries, McDonald returned to face Masanori Kanehara on January 2, 2016, at UFC 195. He won the fight via submission in the second round, after nearly being submitted himself by an arm-triangle choke in the preceding sequence of the fight. The win also earned McDonald his first Performance of the Night bonus award.

McDonald next faced John Lineker on July 13, 2016, at UFC Fight Night 91. He lost the fight via knockout in the first round.

Bellator MMA
On March 16, 2017, McDonald announced that he was parting ways with the UFC due to their dealing with him "very dishonestly and disrespectfully." On March 24, 2017, McDonald announced he signed a deal with Bellator MMA. 

McDonald made his promotional debut on December 15, 2017, at Bellator 191 against Peter Ligier. He won the fight by unanimous decision.

McDonald next faced former Bellator Bantamweight Champion Eduardo Dantas on July 13, 2018, at Bellator 202.  He won the fight via knockout in the first round. McDonald suffered a broken hand in the bout, leaving McDonald questioning whether his career would continue.

McDonald announced his retirement from professional MMA competition on September 27, 2018.

Championships and accomplishments
Tachi Palace Fights
TPF Bantamweight Championship (One time)
Ultimate Fighting Championship
Fight of the Night (Two times) vs. Edwin Figueroa, Brad Pickett 
Knockout of the Night (One time) vs. Alex Soto 
Submission of the Night (One time) vs. Brad Pickett
Performance of the Night (One time) vs. Masanori Kanehara
Youngest fighter to compete for a UFC championship (22 years, 32 days)

Mixed martial arts record

|-
|Win
|align=center|19–4
|Eduardo Dantas
|KO (punches)
|Bellator 202
|
|align=center|1
|align=center|0:58
|Thackerville, Oklahoma, United States
|
|-
|Win
|align=center|18–4
|Peter Ligier
|Decision (unanimous)
|Bellator 191
|
|align=center|3
|align=center|5:00
|Newcastle, England
|
|-
|Loss
|align=center|17–4
|John Lineker
|KO (punches)
|UFC Fight Night: McDonald vs. Lineker
|
|align=center|1
|align=center|2:43
|Sioux Falls, South Dakota, United States
|
|-
|Win
|align=center|17–3
|Masanori Kanehara
|Submission (rear-naked choke)
|UFC 195 
|
|align=center|2
|align=center|2:09
|Las Vegas, Nevada, United States
|
|-
| Loss
| align=center| 16–3
| Urijah Faber
| Submission (guillotine choke)
| UFC on Fox: Johnson vs. Benavidez 2
| 
| align=center| 2
| align=center| 3:22
| Sacramento, California, United States
|
|-
| Win
| align=center| 16–2
| Brad Pickett
| Submission (triangle choke)
| UFC Fight Night: Shogun vs. Sonnen
| 
| align=center| 2
| align=center| 3:43
| Boston, Massachusetts, United States
| 
|-
| Loss
| align=center| 15–2
| Renan Barão
| Submission (arm-triangle choke)
| UFC on Fuel TV: Barão vs. McDonald
| 
| align=center| 4
| align=center| 3:57
| London, England
| 
|-
| Win
| align=center| 15–1
| Miguel Torres
| KO (punches)
| UFC 145
| 
| align=center| 1
| align=center| 3:18
| Atlanta, Georgia, United States
| 
|-
| Win
| align=center| 14–1
| Alex Soto
| KO (punches)
| UFC 139
| 
| align=center| 1
| align=center| 0:56
| San Jose, California, United States
| 
|-
| Win
| align=center| 13–1
| Chris Cariaso
| Decision (split)
| UFC 130
| 
| align=center| 3
| align=center| 5:00
| Las Vegas, Nevada, United States
| 
|-
| Win
| align=center| 12–1
| Edwin Figueroa
| Decision (unanimous)
| UFC Fight Night: Nogueira vs. Davis
| 
| align=center| 3
| align=center| 5:00
| Seattle, Washington, United States
| 
|-
| Win
| align=center| 11–1
| Clint Godfrey
| Submission (armbar)
| WEC 52
| 
| align=center| 1
| align=center| 2:42
| Las Vegas, Nevada, United States
| 
|-
| Win
| align=center| 10–1
| Cole Escovedo
| KO (punches)
| TPF 5: Stars and Strikes
| 
| align=center| 2
| align=center| 1:12
| Lemoore, California, United States
| 
|-
| Win
| align=center| 9–1
| Manny Tapia
| TKO (punches)
| TPF 3: Champions Collide
| 
| align=center| 1
| align=center| 4:31
| Lemoore, California, United States
| 
|-
| Win
| align=center| 8–1
| Carlos Garces
| TKO (punches)
| TPF 1: Tachi Palace Fights 1
| 
| align=center| 1
| align=center| 2:01
| Lemoore, California, United States
| 
|-
| Loss
| align=center| 7–1
| Cole Escovedo
| TKO (punches)
| PFC 13: Validation
| 
| align=center| 2
| align=center| 2:25
| Lemoore, California, United States
| 
|-
| Win
| align=center| 7–0
| Jason Georgianna
| TKO (punches)
| PFC 12: High Stakes
| 
| align=center| 1
| align=center| 2:38
| Lemoore, California, United States
| 
|-
| Win
| align=center| 6–0
| Randy Rodoni
| KO (punch)
| Gladiator Challenge 86: Day of the Dead
| 
| align=center| 1
| align=center| 0:47
| Porterville, California, United States
| 
|-
| Win
| align=center| 5–0
| Fernando Arreola
| Submission (D'Arce choke)
| Gladiator Challenge 84: Bad Blood
| 
| align=center| 1
| align=center| 3:49
| Porterville, California, United States
| 
|-
| Win
| align=center| 4–0
| Javier Vargas
| TKO (punches)
| Gladiator Challenge 81: Lights Out
| 
| align=center| 1
| align=center| 1:38
| Porterville, California, United States
| 
|-
| Win
| align=center| 3–0
| Steve Frano
| TKO (punches)
| Gladiator Challenge 78: No Limits
| 
| align=center| 1
| align=center| 1:17
| Porterville, California, United States
| 
|-
| Win
| align=center| 2–0
| Dominic Pena
| Submission (arm-triangle choke)
| Gladiator Challenge 76: Alpha Dog Challenge
| 
| align=center| 1
| align=center| 1:12
| Porterville, California, United States
| 
|-
| Win
| align=center| 1–0
| Joe Corona
| Submission (triangle choke) 
| Gladiator Challenge 71: Lock-N-Load
| 
| align=center| 1
| align=center| 1:17
| Porterville, California, United States
|

See also
 List of current Bellator fighters
 List of male mixed martial artists

References

External links

Official UFC Profile

American male mixed martial artists
American practitioners of Brazilian jiu-jitsu
People awarded a black belt in Brazilian jiu-jitsu
Bantamweight mixed martial artists
Mixed martial artists utilizing Brazilian jiu-jitsu
Mixed martial artists from California
Living people
Sportspeople from Modesto, California
1991 births
Ultimate Fighting Championship male fighters